The 2008-09 FFHG Division 1 season was contested by 14 teams, and saw the Rapaces de Gap win the championship. They were promoted to the Ligue Magnus as result. The Chiefs de Deuil-Garges and the Jets de Viry-Essonne were relegated to FFHG Division 2.

Regular season

Playoffs

External links
Season on hockeyarchives.info

FFHG Division 1 seasons
2008–09 in French ice hockey
Fra